Stikine, meaning "great river" in the Tlingit language, may refer to:

Geography and locations
the Stikine River, a major river in British Columbia and Alaska
Stikine Strait, a marine waterway in Alaska offshore from the mouth of the Stikine River, near Wrangell, Alaska
Fort Stikine, a trading post and fortification of the Hudson's Bay Company at what is now Wrangell, Alaska 
the Stikine Country, aka the Stikine District, a geographic region of the Canadian province of British Columbia, roughly equivalent to the Stikine Mining Division aka Stikine Mining District of the British Columbia Dept. of Mines
the Stikine Plateau, a large regional landform in northwestern British Columbia, inclusive of the Stikine and Taku River basins
the Stikine Ranges, a major subgrouping of the Cassiar Mountains of northern British Columbia
Stikine, British Columbia, aka Boundary, an unincorporated locality and former customs post on the lower Stikine River
Stikine River Provincial Park, a provincial park protecting the Grand Canyon of the Stikine River
Stikine Hot Springs, a hot spring on the lower Stikine River protected by Choquette Hot Springs Provincial Park
the Stikine Volcanic Belt, a subgrouping of volcanoes within the Northern Cordilleran Volcanic Province in British Columbia
the Stikine Icecap, a large icefield in the Boundary Ranges of the Coast Mountains, spanning the British Columbia-Alaska border
Stikine-LeConte Wilderness, a park in the Alaska Panhandle
Tongass/Stikine National Forest, aka the Tongass National Forest, a US national forest in Alaska

Political units
the Stikine Territory, formally the Stickeen Territories, a former British overseas territory established in 1861, absorbed into the Colony of British Columbia in 1863
the Stikine Region, an administrative region of the Canadian province of British Columbia
the Regional District of Kitimat-Stikine, a regional district in northwestern British Columbia
Stikine (provincial electoral district), a provincial electoral district in northwestern British Columbia

People
 Stikine people (Shtaxʼhéen Ḵwáan), a ḵwáan or regional group of the Tlingit